Brazilian battleship Rio de Janeiro may refer to:
 A cancelled battleship of the  contracted to Brazil.

See also
 
 
 
 Rio de Janeiro (disambiguation)

Battleships of the Brazilian Navy